The 1999 Nigerian Senate election in Nasarawa State was held on February 20, 1999, to elect members of the Nigerian Senate to represent Nasarawa State. Patrick Aga representing Nasarawa North, Abubakar Sodangi representing Nasarawa West and Haruna Abubakar representing Nasarawa South all won on the platform of the Peoples Democratic Party.

Overview

Summary

Results

Nasarawa North 
The election was won by Patrick Agaof the Peoples Democratic Party.

Nasarawa West 
The election was won by Abubakar Sodangi of the Peoples Democratic Party.

Nasarawa South 
The election was won by Haruna Abubakarof the Peoples Democratic Party.

References 

Nas
Nasarawa State Senate elections
Nas